Roy Lee "Rocky" Dennis (December 4, 1961 – October 4, 1978) was an American teenager who had craniodiaphyseal dysplasia, an extremely rare sclerotic bone disorder. The condition usually results in neurological disorders and death during childhood or teenage years. His life was the basis for the 1985 drama film Mask.

Early life and diagnosis
Rocky Dennis was born in Glendora, California, to Florence "Rusty" Tullis and Roy Dennis, his legal but not biological father. At the age of two, he was diagnosed with craniodiaphyseal dysplasia, also known as CDD or lionitis, an extremely rare disease occurring in approximately one in every 220 million births, with fewer than 20 recorded cases. CDD is a bone disorder that causes bone tissue to build up excessively, including in the skull, causing gradual compression of the brain and thus intracranial hypertension. 
Based on the small number of recorded cases, doctors predicted that the pressure from bone accumulation on the central nervous system and cranial nerves would destroy his eyesight and hearing, and eventually affect his brain, with death before his seventh 
birthday.

Teen years
Despite his eyesight limitations, hearing problems, and the painful headaches he endured, Dennis was eventually able to do a number of things his doctors predicted he would be unable to. Dennis learned to read even though his poor eyesight kept him from reading books. He entered school at age six, although school authorities recommended against it; and after a slow start (he spent two years in the first grade) he was able to make academic progress before his death at 16. Dennis declined to have plastic surgery to correct his facial malformation.

Dennis resided in Azusa, California, as well as Covina. There, along with his half-brother, Joshua, he lived with his parents and attended Ben Lomond Elementary School. Following his mother leaving the family, Dennis was raised for a time by his legal father and grandmother as well as his stepmother.

Dennis died on October 4, 1978. His official cause of death was sudden arrhythmic death syndrome, a condition of unknown origins that may or may not have been related to his craniodiaphyseal dysplasia. Dennis' body was donated to UCLA Medical Center.

Family
Dennis's older half-brother, Joshua "John" Mason, died in 1987 at age 32 from complications of AIDS. Joshua did not appear and was not mentioned in Mask. His mother, Rusty Tullis, died on November 11, 2006, at age 70 as a result of an infection following a motorcycle accident.

In popular culture
Peter Bogdanovich directed the 1985 film Mask, from Anna Hamilton Phelan's screenplay based on Dennis' life. Eric Stoltz portrayed Dennis. In one scene in the film, Stoltz's Dennis reads a poem to his mother, Rusty (played by Cher), that was written by Dennis. The movie is based loosely on Dennis' life, with most of the scenes and dialogue altered for dramatic purposes.

Phelan adapted her screenplay into a stage musical of the same name, with music by Barry Mann and Cynthia Weil. The musical premiered at the Pasadena Playhouse in California on March 12, 2008.

Swedish pop musician Jens Lekman self-published a song titled "Rocky Dennis' Farewell Song to the Blind Girl", causing DJs to mistakenly call the musician by Rocky Dennis' name. Lekman clarified that the song was not about himself with the release of Rocky Dennis in Heaven, an EP containing four songs about Dennis and his film portrayal.

References

American people with disabilities
1961 births
1978 deaths
People from Glendora, California